Events in the year 1828 in Bolivia.

Incumbents 
 President:
 Antonio José de Sucre (until 18 April)
 José María Pérez de Urdininea (acting: 18 April–2 August)
 José Miguel de Velasco (acting: 2 August–18 December)
 José Ramón de Loayza (acting: 18–26 December)
 Pedro Blanco Soto (provisional: starting 26 December)
 Vice President:
 Vacant (until 26 December)
 José Miguel de Velasco (designate: 12 August–18 December)
 José Ramón de Loayza (designate: 18–26 December)
 José Ramón de Loayza (provisional: starting 26 December)

Ongoing events 
 Peruvian–Bolivian War (1828)

Events

April 
 18 April – Military mutiny in Chuquisaca. President Antonio José de Sucre is wounded and delegates command to President of the Council of Ministers José María Pérez de Urdininea.
 30 April – The revolt in Chuquisaca is quelled.

May 
 1 May – Peruvian–Bolivian War: Peruvian forces under Agustín Gamarra cross the Desaguadero River into Bolivia, seeking to expel Gran Colombian influence in the country.

July 
 6 July – Peruvian–Bolivian War: The Treaty of Piquiza is signed between Sucre and Gamarra. Gran Colombian troops are required to withdraw while Peruvian troops will remain for some time.

August 
 2 August – President Sucre presents his definitive resignation to Congress. Simultaneously, a new cabinet is appointed by decree, presided by José Miguel de Velasco.
 12 August – Andrés de Santa Cruz and José Miguel de Velasco are elected provisional president and vice president by the General Constituent Congress. Velasco assumes command pending the arrival of Santa Cruz.

December 
 18 December – Given the continued absence of Santa Cruz, the Congress reconvenes and elects Pedro Blanco Soto and José Ramón de Loayza provisional president and vice president, in the framework of an assembly dominated by the interests of Agustín Gamarra and the Peruvian Army.
 31 December – President Blanco is arrested by anti-Peruvian rebels.

Births

Deaths 
 30 April – José Miguel García Lanza, guerilla. (b. 1791)

Notes

Footnotes

Citations

Bibliography 

 
1800s in Bolivia
Bolivia
Bolivia
Years of the 19th century in Bolivia